Louise Howard is Professor of Women's Mental Health, King's College London.  Howard's research includes medication in pregnancy, violence and health and the effectiveness and cost-effectiveness of perinatal mental health services. She is an Honorary Consultant Perinatal Psychiatrist with South London and Maudsley NHS Foundation Trust.

Howard is Chair of the NICE National Collaborating Centre for Mental Health Guideline Development Group on Antenatal and Postnatal Mental Health and a member of the International Editorial Board of the British Journal of Psychiatry. In 2019 she became a Senior Investigator at the National Institute for Health and Care Research (NIHR).

Bibliography

References

Year of birth missing (living people)
Living people
Academics of King's College London
British women psychologists
British women academics
British psychiatrists
British women psychiatrists
NIHR Research Professors
NIHR Senior Investigators